Matthew Breen may refer to:

Matthew Breen (journalist), American journalist and entertainment writer
Matthew Breen (tennis) (born 1976), retired Australian professional tennis player
Matthew Breen, musician in Emanuel (band)